State Road 231 (NM 231) is a  state highway in the US state of New Mexico. NM 231's western terminus is at NM 278 southeast of Tucumcari, and the eastern terminus is at NM 469 north of Grady.

Major intersections

See also

References

231
Transportation in Quay County, New Mexico